The Bondurant-Hustin House, located at 104 Castlewood Dr. in Peewee Valley, Kentucky, is a two-story Queen Anne-style house which was built in 1885.  It was listed on the National Register of Historic Places in 1989.

It is asymmetric in plan and has a round tower with a conical roof.  It has a wraparound porch with Tuscan-style columns.  The property includes a carriage house which is a second contributing building in the listing.

References

Houses on the National Register of Historic Places in Kentucky
Queen Anne architecture in Kentucky
Houses completed in 1885
National Register of Historic Places in Oldham County, Kentucky
1885 establishments in Kentucky
Houses in Oldham County, Kentucky
Buildings and structures in Pewee Valley, Kentucky